Aglaia squamulosa is a species of plant in the family Meliaceae. It is found in Indonesia, Malaysia, and the Philippines.

References

squamulosa
Near threatened plants
Taxonomy articles created by Polbot